The Netherlands Antilles competed at the 1988 Summer Olympics in Seoul, South Korea.  Jan Boersma won the nation's first ever Olympic medal.

Competitors
The following is the list of number of competitors in the Games.

Medalists

Results by event

Swimming
Men's 50m Freestyle
 Hilton Woods
 Heat – 23.46 
 B-Final – 23.65 (→ 16th place)

Men's 100m Freestyle
 Hilton Woods
 Heat – 50.73 
 B-Final – 51.25 (→ 16th place)

References

Official Olympic Reports
International Olympic Committee results database

Nations at the 1988 Summer Olympics
1988
Oly